Rainbow City is a British television series made by the BBC and shown in 1967. It was created and produced by John Elliot.

The series was the first British TV series to feature a black actor, Errol John in the lead character. John starred as John Steele, a black solicitor, and the series dealt with his personal and professional problems living and working in the multi-ethnic community of Birmingham. John Elliot had been approached by the head of programmes for BBC Birmingham to develop a series about the Caribbean community in Great Britain. Elliot wrote several episodes in collaboration with Trinidadian actor, Horace James, who was cast in one of the other main roles. The series was shot at the BBC's Gosta Green studio in Birmingham. Five of the six episodes survive.

Mary, Steele's white wife, was played by Gemma Jones, later the star of the BBC's The Duchess of Duke Street.

References

External links
 

1960s British drama television series
1960s British legal television series
1967 British television series debuts
1967 British television series endings
BBC television dramas
Black-and-white British television shows
Television shows set in Birmingham, West Midlands